Mohamed Oulhaj (born 6 January 1988 in Al Hoceima) is a former Moroccan footballer, who played as a defender for Raja Casablanca.

Club career
Jean-Yves Chay was the coach of Raja Casablanca when Oulhaj played his first official match with the team on September 22, 2007 against Olympique Khouribga in Complexe OCP. Oulhaj was only 19 years old and was chosen as a starter.

On October 19, 2008, he scored his first goal in his professional career during a 5–0 winning match against Chabab Massira.

International career
After Oulhaj's great performances with Raja Casablanca on the season of 2007–08, the former national coach Fathi Jamal call him firstly to represent Morocco against Ethiopia for the 2010 FIFA World Cup qualification but he didn't have a chance to play.

On June 14, 2008, he made his first match with the team in Kigali against Rwanda when Morocco lost 3–1. Oulhaj had started the match and was replaced by Hicham Aboucherouane in the 36th minute.

Career statistics

Honours

Club
Raja Casablanca
 Botola: 2008–09, 2010–11, 2012–13
 Coupe du Trône: 2012, 2017
 CAF Confederation Cup: 2018
 CAF Super Cup: 2019

Individual
 Eleven of Gold:
 Best Defensive Midfielder: 2007–08
 Best Center-Back: 2008–09

References

External links
 Mohamed Oulhaj player info at the official Raja Casablanca website 
 

1988 births
Living people
Moroccan footballers
Footballers from Casablanca
Morocco international footballers
Raja CA players
Association football defenders
Morocco A' international footballers
People from Al Hoceima
2016 African Nations Championship players